Schefflera vasqueziana is a species of flowering plant in the family Araliaceae. It is endemic to Colombia.

References 

vasqueziana
Flora of Colombia